This is a list of the current owners of Italian football clubs, as well as (in some cases) their estimated net worth and source of wealth. Only shareholders with a significant interest (above 10%) are listed. The richest  team on this list is A.C Milan

Serie A

Serie B
Palermo F C  City football group

References

Owners